The 2007–08 WHL season was the 42nd season of the Western Hockey League (WHL). The regular season began on September 20, 2007, and ended on March 16, 2008. The WHL Playoffs began on March 21, 2008, and ended on May 7, 2008.

A new expansion team, the Edmonton Oil Kings, joined the league bringing the WHL to 22 teams that played a 72-game season. The Spokane Chiefs won the Ed Chynoweth Cup, defeating the Lethbridge Hurricanes in four games. Spokane would go on to capture the Memorial Cup.

League notes 
 The Oil Kings joined the Central Division of the Eastern Conference, bringing the Eastern Conference to twelve teams, while the Western Conference remained at ten. The new team in Alberta's capital is the fourth WHL team to represent the city of Edmonton, preceded by the original Oil Kings franchises that played in the 1960s and 1970s, and later the Edmonton Ice, who played two seasons from 1996 to 1998 before relocating to the Kootenays.
 The playoff format was revised so that the top eight teams in the conference qualify for the playoffs, as opposed to the top four in each division.  Division winners are guaranteed a top two seed in each conference.

Final standings 
Note: GP = Games played; W = Wins; L = Losses; OTL = Overtime losses; SOL = Shootout losses; GF = Goals for; GA = Goals against; Pts = Points; x = Clinched playoff berth; y = Clinched conference title

Eastern Conference

Western Conference

Scoring leaders 

Note: GP = Games played; G = Goals; A = Assists; Pts = Points; PIM = Penalty minutes

Leading goaltenders 
Note: GP = Games played; Min = Minutes played; W = Wins; L = Losses; SOL = Shootout losses ; GA = Goals against; SO = Total shutouts; SV% = Save percentage; GAA = Goals against average

2008 WHL Playoffs

Overview

Conference quarter-finals

Eastern Conference

Western Conference

Conference semi-finals

Conference finals

WHL Championship

Memorial Cup 

The 90th MasterCard Memorial Cup was held in Kitchener, Ontario. It began on May 16, and concluded on May 25, 2008.

WHL awards

All-Star Teams

source: Western Hockey League press release

2008 Bantam Draft
First round

Notes

See also 
 2008 Memorial Cup
 2007–08 OHL season
 2007–08 QMJHL season
 2008 NHL Entry Draft
 2007 in ice hockey
 2008 in ice hockey

References 
 2006–07 WHL Guide (2007). Western Hockey League. Retrieved on 2007-06-04.

External links 

 Official website of the Western Hockey League
 Official website of the Canadian Hockey League
 Official website of the MasterCard Memorial Cup
 Official website of the Home Hardware Top Prospects Game
 Official website of the ADT Canada Russia Challenge

Western Hockey League seasons
3
3